Woitape Rural LLG is a local-level government (LLG) of Central Province, Papua New Guinea.

Wards
 Chirima
 Chirima Valley
 Dilava
 Fane
 Auga
 Woitape
 Ononge
 Aduai
 Woitape Station

References

Local-level governments of Central Province (Papua New Guinea)